The 2011 Individual European Championship was the 11th UEM Individual Speedway European Championship season. The final took place on 24 September 2011 in Rivne, Ukraine. The defending champion was Sebastian Ułamek from Poland.

Final 
 24 September 2011
  Rivne, Volhynia
 Rivenenskyy Mototrek (Length: 360 m)
 References

See also 
 Motorcycle Speedway
 2011 Individual Speedway Junior European Championship

References 

2011
European Individual
Speedway competitions in Poland